The 1990–91 UNLV Runnin' Rebels basketball team represented the University of Nevada, Las Vegas in  NCAA Division I men's competition in the 1990–91 season. The Runnin' Rebels, coached by Jerry Tarkanian, entered the season as defending national champions and entered the 1991 NCAA tournament unbeaten, but lost in the national semifinal to eventual champions Duke when Anderson Hunt's desperation three in the final seconds bounced off the backboard and into the hands of a Duke player, Bobby Hurley, ending a 45-game winning streak that dated back to the previous season. They had been the last team to finish the regular season unbeaten before St. Joseph's did it in 2004. They were the last team to enter the NCAA tournament unbeaten until Wichita State did it in 2014, Kentucky in 2015, and Gonzaga in 2021.

The team played its home games in the Thomas & Mack Center, and was a member of the Big West Conference; it would join the Western Athletic Conference in 1996 and become a charter member of its current conference, the Mountain West Conference, in 1999.

UNLV’s semi-final loss in the NCAA tournament brought an end to their astounding 45-game win streak. That is the fourth-longest consecutive-game win streak in NCAA Division 1 basketball history, and the longest win streak since the longest one ever (by UCLA) ended in 1974.

The nickname "Runnin' Rebels" is unique to men's basketball at UNLV. The default nickname for men's sports teams at the school is simply "Rebels", while all women's teams are known as "Lady Rebels".

Roster

1990-91 UNLV Roster and Stats

Schedule and results

|-
!colspan=12 style=| Regular Season

|-
!colspan=12 style=| Big West tournament

|-
!colspan=12 style=| NCAA Tournament

Sources 1990-91 UNLV Schedule and Results

Rankings

Awards and honors
 Larry Johnson – Naismith College Player of the Year, USBWA College Player of the Year, John R. Wooden Award
 Stacey Augmon – NABC Defensive Player of the Year (3)

Team players drafted into the NBA

References

Unlv
UNLV Runnin' Rebels basketball seasons
NCAA Division I men's basketball tournament Final Four seasons
Unlv
Unlv
Unlv